Sphenomorphus variegatus is a species of skink. It is found throughout most of the Philippines, and in some parts of Malaysia (Borneo) and Indonesia (Sulawesi).

References

variegatus
Reptiles of the Philippines
Reptiles described in 1867
Reptiles of Borneo